Phil "Red" Shafer (November 13, 1891 Des Moines, Iowa – January 29, 1971 Des Moines, Iowa)  was an American racecar driver. He made 30 AAA Championship Car starts from 1923 to 1952. He captured one win in 1924 at the New York State Fairgrounds Raceway in Syracuse, New York. That year he finished a career best 9th in the National Championship. His last oval or road course Championship Car start came in 1936 - afterwards the only Championship starts he made were in the Pikes Peak Auto Hillclimb.  He later built his own racing chassis.

Indianapolis 500 results

References

1891 births
1971 deaths
Sportspeople from Des Moines, Iowa
Indianapolis 500 drivers
Racing drivers from Des Moines, Iowa
Racing drivers from Iowa
AAA Championship Car drivers